Pavetta holstii is a species of plant in the family Rubiaceae. It is endemic to Tanzania.

References

Flora of Tanzania
holstii
Vulnerable plants
Taxonomy articles created by Polbot